Dame Mary Eugenia Charles,  (15 May 1919 – 6 September 2005) was a Dominican politician who was Prime Minister of Dominica from 21 July 1980 until 14 June 1995. The first female lawyer in Dominica, she was Dominica's first, and to date only, female prime minister. She was the second female prime minister in the Caribbean after Lucina da Costa of the Netherlands Antilles. She was the first female in the Americas to be elected in her own right as head of government. She served for the second longest period of any Dominican prime minister, and was the world's fourth longest-serving female Prime Minister, behind Sheikh Hasina of Bangladesh, Sirimavo Bandaranaike of Sri Lanka and Indira Gandhi of India. She established a record for the longest continuous service of any woman Prime Minister.

She was also described as the "Iron Lady of the Caribbean."

Personal life 

Eugenia Charles was born on 15 May 1919, in the fishing village of Pointe Michel in Saint Luke Parish, Dominica. She was the daughter of John Baptiste Charles and Josephine Charles ( Delauney), the youngest of four children. Her family was considered part of the "coloured bourgeoisie", descendants of free people of color. Her father was a mason who became a wealthy landowner and had business interests in export-import.

She attended the Convent High School in Roseau, Dominica, which was then the island's only girls' secondary school, and St Joseph's Convent in Grenada. Afterward Charles became interested in law while working at the colonial magistrate's court. She worked for many years as assistant to Alastair Forbes. Charles attended the University of Toronto in Canada, receiving her LL.B. in 1947. She then moved to the United Kingdom to attend the London School of Economics, where she earned her LL.M. in 1949. She was a member of the sorority Sigma Gamma Rho. She trained as a barrister at the Inner Temple and was called to the bar in London in 1947.

She passed the bar and returned to Dominica, where she became the island's first female lawyer. She established a practice specialising in property law. She also worked as a director of the Dominican Cooperative Bank, which had been established by her father, and instituted the country's first student loan scheme.

Charles never married nor had children. In 1991, she was made a Dame Commander of the Order of the British Empire.

Political career 

Charles began campaigning in politics during the 1960s against restrictions on press freedom. She wrote anonymous newspaper columns for The Herald and The Star criticising the Dominica Labour Party government. In 1967, she became involved in the Freedom Fighters, an advocacy group which opposed the Seditious and Undesirable Publications Act. In October 1968, the group merged with the National Democratic Movement of Dominica to become the Dominica Freedom Party (DFP). The party held its first convention in June 1969 and Charles was appointed as its leader, a position she would hold until 1995.

Charles contested the Roseau North seat in the 1970 general election but lost to Patrick John. She was elected to the House of Assembly in the 1975 general election, representing the constituency of Roseau Central and became the Leader of the Opposition. Charles was a delegate at the 1977 constitutional conference at Marlborough House in London and actively supported Dominica gaining full independence from British rule in 1978. In 1979, she was a member of the Committee for National Salvation, which created an interim government after the resignation of Patrick John.

Charles became Prime Minister when the DFP swept the 1980 general election, the party's first electoral victory. She took over from Oliver Seraphin, who had taken over only the year before, when mass protests had forced the country's first prime minister, Patrick John, to step down from office. Her first term was focused on rebuilding infrastructure and disaster management as Hurricane David had hit Dominica on 29 August 1979. She additionally served as Dominica's Foreign Minister from 1980 to 1990, Minister of Finance from 1980 to 1995, and as chairperson of the Organisation of Eastern Caribbean States (OECS).

In 1981 she faced two attempted coups d'état. That year Frederick Newton, commander of the Military of Dominica, organised an attack on the police headquarters in Roseau, resulting in the death of a police officer. Newton and five other soldiers were found guilty in the attack and sentenced to death in 1983. The sentences of the five accomplices were later commuted to life in prison, but Newton was executed in 1986.

In 1981, a group of Canadian and American mercenaries, mostly affiliated with white supremacist and Ku Klux Klan groups, planned a coup to restore former Prime Minister Patrick John to power. The attempt, which the conspirators codenamed Operation Red Dog, was thwarted by American federal agents in New Orleans, Louisiana. It was soon facetiously dubbed the "Bayou of Pigs", referring to the failed Bay of Pigs Invasion years before in Cuba.

Charles became more widely known to the outside world for her role in the lead-up to the United States Invasion of Grenada on 25 October 1983. In the wake of the arrest and execution of Grenadian Prime Minister Maurice Bishop, Charles, then serving as chair of the OECS, appealed to the United States, Jamaica, and Barbados for intervention. She appeared on television with U.S. president Ronald Reagan, supporting the invasion. Journalist Bob Woodward reported that the U.S. paid millions of dollars to the Dominica government, some of which was regarded by the Central Intelligence Agency as a "payoff", for Charles's support of the intervention.

She was re-elected in the 1985 general election and the 1990 general election. Charles and her party were considered conservative by Caribbean standards. However, American observers considered many of her policies to be centrist or even leftist; for instance, she supported some social welfare programmes. Other issues that were important to her were anti-corruption laws and individual freedom. For her uncompromising stance on this and other issues, she became known as the "Iron Lady of the Caribbean" (after the original "Iron Lady", Margaret Thatcher).

Later years and death 
With popularity declining during her third term, Charles retired in 1995. The DFP subsequently lost the 1995 general election. After retiring, Charles undertook speaking engagements in the United States and abroad. She became involved in former U.S. President Jimmy Carter's Carter Center, which promotes human rights and observes elections to encourage fairness.

On 30 August 2005, Charles entered a hospital in Fort-de-France, Martinique, for hip-replacement surgery. She died from a pulmonary embolism on 6 September, at the age of 86. She was buried in Pointe Michel on 14 September.

See also 
 First women lawyers around the world

References

Further reading 
 Gabriel J. Christian, Mamo! The Life & Times of Dame Mary Eugenia Charles , Pont Casse Press, 2010.
 "Memorial Mass for Dame Eugenia", The Chronicle, 11 September 2009.
 Torild Skard (2014), "Eugenia Charles", Women of power – half a century of female presidents and prime ministers worldwide, Bristol: Policy Press, 
 Alan Gregor Cobley and Eudine Barriteau (2006), Enjoying Power: Eugenia Charles and Political Leadership in the Commonwealth Caribbean, University of the West Indies Press, 
 Janet Higbie (1993), Eugenia: The Caribbean's Iron Lady, Macmillan Caribbean,

External links 
 .

1919 births
2005 deaths
20th-century women politicians
Alumni of the London School of Economics
Dames Commander of the Order of the British Empire
Deaths from pulmonary embolism
Dominica Freedom Party politicians
Dominica lawyers
Women government ministers of Dominica
Female foreign ministers
Members of the House of Assembly of Dominica
People from Saint Luke Parish, Dominica
Prime Ministers of Dominica
Foreign ministers of Dominica
Finance ministers of Dominica
University of Toronto alumni
Women prime ministers
Dominica women diplomats
Dominica women lawyers
Dominica expatriates in the United Kingdom
Female defence ministers
20th-century women lawyers
Dominica women in politics
Recipients of the Order of the Caribbean Community
20th-century Dominica women politicians